Thrace (Modern  Thráki;) or Thraike in Greek mythology, was the eponymous heroine and sorceress of Thrace. She was the daughter of Oceanus and Parthenope, and sister of Europa.

Notes

Reference 
 Grimal, Pierre, The Dictionary of Classical Mythology, Wiley-Blackwell, 1996. 

Greek mythological witches
Oceanids
Children of Oceanus
Mythological Thracian women